Afro Mountain is a painting by Ellen Gallagher. It is in the collection of the Whitney Museum of American Art in New York, New York in the United States.

Description
The painting keeps with the tradition of Gallagher's works of the 1990s and is considered an example of minimalist abstract art. It comprises penmanship paper glued to a canvas with ink drawings of lips which overtake the entire bottom half of the large canvas.

History

Afro Mountain was created by Gallagher in an empty print shop at Harvard University in 1994. The painting was a gift of an anonymous donor, in 1995, to the Whitney.  Afro Mountain was exhibited at the Tate Modern's 2013 retrospective about Gallagher titled "Ellen Gallagher: AxME: Room 7." In 2010, the piece was included in the Whitney Biennial.

References

1994 paintings
Paintings by Ellen Gallagher